Tribounia is a genus of flowering plants belonging to the family Gesneriaceae.

It is native to Thailand.

Known species, according to Kew:
 Tribounia grandiflora D.J.Middleton 
 Tribounia venosa (Barnett) D.J.Middleton 

The genus name of Tribounia is in honour of Pramote Triboun (fl. 1990 – 2002), a Thai botanist at the Thailand Institute of Scientific and Technological Research. It was first described and published in Taxon Vol.61 on page 1287 in 2012.

References

Didymocarpoideae
Gesneriaceae genera
Plants described in 2012
Flora of Thailand